Saints Meuris and Thea (perhaps the same as Valentina and Thea; died ) were two Christian women who were martyred at Gaza, Palestine.
Their feast day is 19 December.

Monks of Ramsgate account

The monks of St Augustine's Abbey, Ramsgate wrote in their Book of Saints (1921),

Butler's account

The hagiographer Alban Butler (1710–1773) wrote in his Lives of the Fathers, Martyrs, and Other Principal Saints under December 19,

Eusebius and Cureton's notes

Eusebius, Bishop of Caesarea, records how in Gaza at this time a virgin named Valentina and her sister were tortured and then bound together and burned to death. 
William Cureton (1808–1864) in his translation of Eusebius's History of the Martyrs in Palestine notes that Eusebius gives no name for Valentina's companion, calling her only "the sister". He goes on,

Cureton goes on the explain that the compilers of the Menologium may have assumed that these two virgins, which were mentioned by Eusebius just after an account of some Egyptians, were also Egyptians and suffered the same fate.

Notes

Sources

 
 
 

Ante-Nicene Christian female saints
Saints from Roman Syria
307 deaths